Nizhneye Isakovo is a rural locality (a village) in Yenangskoye Rural Settlement, Kichmengsko-Gorodetsky District, Vologda Oblast, Russia. The population was 26 as of 2002.

Geography 
Nizhneye Isakovo is located 71 km east of Kichmengsky Gorodok (the district's administrative centre) by road. Nizhneye Nikitino is the nearest rural locality.

References 

Rural localities in Kichmengsko-Gorodetsky District